Charles Edward Finlason (19 February 1860 – 31 July 1917) played a single match of Test cricket for the South African national side, against England in March 1889.

Finlason was born in Camberwell, London, and died in Surbiton, London. He played first-class cricket in South Africa for Griqualand West (also known as Kimberley at the time) and Transvaal between 1888 and 1891. In 1889, he played a single Test match for South Africa against England, scoring six runs across two innings and failing to take a wicket.

In April 1891, Finlason recorded his single first-class century, for Griqualand West against the Transvaal in the second season of the Currie Cup. The match, at the Wanderers ground in Johannesburg, was designated "timeless", and finished with a Griqualand West victory after six days of play spread over a week. Finlason scored 154 not out in Griqualand West's second innings. He featured in a 95-run tenth-wicket partnership with Alfred Cooper, who finished with 41 runs. As of December 2014, this remains a record for the last wicket for Griqualand West.

Later, Finlason described an expedition as a newspaperman to Salisbury, Rhodesia by ox-drawn cart in his 1893 book A Nobody in Mashonaland.

Other reading 
 
  2nd edition.

References 

1860 births
1917 deaths
People from Camberwell
South Africa Test cricketers
South African cricketers
Gauteng cricketers
Griqualand West cricketers
English emigrants to South Africa